James Herwald Ramsbotham, 2nd Viscount Soulbury (21 March 1915 – 12 December 2004) was the elder son of the Rt Hon Herwald Ramsbotham, 1st Viscount Soulbury, British Conservative politician.

Army and marriage
At the outbreak of World War II he signed up with the REME, rapidly mastering the professional techniques, meanwhile continuing his work with groups in England.  He married Anthea Margaret Wilton on 5 April 1949 (she died 26 June 1950).

Life in Sri Lanka
From the late 1950s he lived in Ceylon (Sri Lanka), where his father had been Governor-General, as a Hindu yogi under the name Santhaswami. Although he ran the Sivathondan Nilayam at Chenkalady in Batticaloa, he also spent much time amongst the Veddas, aboriginal tribal peoples. He used to go off for long periods to their strongholds deep in the jungles and forests. Inevitably one newspaper or another would "scoop" the story of his death. He would subsequently emerge again from one of these forays, wondering what all the fuss was about. He then moved to Kaithadi Ashram at Jaffna, where he lived until 1986.

Publications
Yoga Swami: The Sage of Lanka

Arms

References

External links

1915 births
2004 deaths
Viscounts in the Peerage of the United Kingdom
British Army personnel of World War II
People from British Ceylon
English Hindus
Soulbury